In Japanese mythology, the  is the story that describes the legendary birth of the celestial and creative world, the birth of the first gods, and the birth of the Japanese archipelago.

This story is described at the beginning of the Kojiki, the first book written in Japan (712), and in the Nihon Shoki (720). Both form the literary basis of Japanese mythology and Shinto; however, the story differs in some aspects between these works.

Myth 
At the beginning the universe was immersed in a beaten and shapeless kind of matter (chaos), sunk in silence. Later there were sounds indicating the movement of particles. With this movement, the light and the lightest particles rose but the particles were not as fast as the light and could not go higher. Thus, the light was at the top of the Universe, and below it, the particles formed first the clouds and then Heaven, which was to be called . The rest of the particles that had not risen formed a huge mass, dense and dark, to be called Earth.

When Takamagahara was formed, the first three gods appeared:

 and
.

Then these gods:

 and

These five deities, known as Kotoamatsukami, appeared spontaneously, did not have a definite sex, did not have partners (hitorigami) and went into hiding after their emergence. These gods are not mentioned in the rest of the mythology.

Kamiyonanayo

Then two other gods arose:

 and

These gods also emerged spontaneously, did not have a defined sex, did not have a partner, and hid at birth.

Then, five pairs of gods were born (for a total of ten deities), each pair consisting of a male deity and a female deity:

  and his younger sister (and wife) ,
  and his younger sister (and wife) ,
  and his younger sister (and wife) ,
  and his younger sister (and wife)  and
  and his younger sister (and wife) 

All deities from Kuni-no-koto-tachi to Izanami are collectively called .

Following the creation of Heaven and Earth and the appearance of these primordial gods, Izanagi and Izanami went on to create the Japanese archipelago (Kuniumi) and gave birth to a large number of gods (Kamiumi).

See also
Creation myth

References

Bibliography

Japanese mythology
Religious cosmologies
Creation myths